Yuri Danilochkin (born 22 February 1991) is a Belarusian alpine skier. He has competed at the 2014 Winter Olympics in Sochi.

World Cup results

Season standings

Results per discipline

 standings through 26 Jan 2019

World Championship results

Olympic results

Winter Universiade results

References

1991 births
Alpine skiers at the 2014 Winter Olympics
Alpine skiers at the 2018 Winter Olympics
Living people
Olympic alpine skiers of Belarus
Belarusian male alpine skiers
Competitors at the 2015 Winter Universiade